The Zanthus train collision occurred at a crossing loop on the Trans-Australian Railway between Perth and Sydney on 18 August 1999.

Incident
On 18 August 1999 an eastbound freight train was waiting at the departure end of the crossing loop for the westbound Indian Pacific passenger train to pass through.

The second engineman was waiting at the control panel for the points for the opposing train to pass through.  Out of habit he had the control panel box unlocked and opened.  Unfortunately, out of habit, he pressed the button to operate the points at an inappropriate time, and the opposing train was diverted at a speed of about  into the loop where it could not stop in time to avoid a head-on collision.  The actual speed of impact as recorded by the locomotive data logger on NR 15 was 27 km/h.

Injuries and damage
Twenty-one passengers and crew from the Indian Pacific were airlifted by the Royal Flying Doctor Service to Kalgoorlie Hospital from the remote Coonana airstrip,  from the crash site. Only two passengers were admitted for overnight observations. Westrail provided two Prospector railcars to transfer the remainder of the passengers back to Kalgoorlie.

All nineteen coaches of the Indian Pacific received varying degrees of damage, from minor internal damage to the write-off of luggage/smoking car HM311; some abandoned wrecked carriages are still at the site.  At the time, Great Southern Rail estimated the damage to the coaches to be of the value of $5 million. National Rail Corporation estimated the damage to locomotives NR15 and NR51 at around $1 million.

Aftermath
Since the accident, the operation of the points at this and other crossing loops has been altered so that the point indicator lights will not operate until the access process is completed, and this gives all trains time to stop at the red point indicator lights.

The simplified overview of process is: 
access box - 120-180 second delay all line points are/changed to red
door opens
60-90 second delay until point control inputs are accepted, points can then be changed.
close door/seal box, lights are changed to indicate point positions.
All traffic then proceeds as directed.

This accident happened because the points were not fully interlocked, and were merely a kind of power-assisted hand lever, with automatic normalisation.

See also 
 Railway accidents in Western Australia

Notes

External links 
 Railfan report
 
 ATSB Report

1999 in Australia
Railway accidents in 1999
Railway accidents and incidents in Western Australia
1990s in Western Australia
Train collisions in Australia
August 1999 events in Australia